The 1953 Delaware Fightin' Blue Hens football team was an American football team that represented the University of Delaware as an independent during the 1953 college football season. In its third season under head coach David M. Nelson, the team compiled a 7–1 record and outscored opponents by a total of 201 to 80. Johnny Borreson was the team captain. The team played its home games at Delaware Stadium in Newark, Delaware.

Schedule

References

Delaware
Delaware Fightin' Blue Hens football seasons
Delaware Fightin' Blue Hens football